Julien Pillet (born 28 September 1977 in Dijon, Côte-d'Or) is a French sabre fencer. He is a three-time Olympic medalist as he won the gold in the team event at the 2004 Summer Olympics and also at the 2008 Summer Olympics. He also won the silver medal at the 2000 Summer Olympics, again in the sabre team event. He finished 4th in the individual sabre event at the 2008 Beijing Olympics.

Pillet won the individual bronze medal at the 2006 European Seniors Fencing Championship and the gold medal in the sabre team event at the 2006 World Fencing Championships after beating Spain in the final. He accomplished this with his teammates Vincent Anstett, Nicolas Lopez and Boris Sanson.

Other achievements
 2000 Sydney Olympics, team sabre
 2004 Athens Olympics, team sabre
 2005 World Fencing Championships, team sabre
 2006 European Seniors Fencing Championship, individual sabre
 2006 World Fencing Championships, team sabre
 2007 World Fencing Championships, team sabre
 2008 Beijing Olympics, team sabre

References

External links
 Profile at escrime-ffe.fr

1977 births
Living people
Sportspeople from Dijon
French male sabre fencers
Fencers at the 2000 Summer Olympics
Fencers at the 2004 Summer Olympics
Fencers at the 2008 Summer Olympics
Olympic fencers of France
Olympic gold medalists for France
Olympic silver medalists for France
Olympic medalists in fencing
Medalists at the 2000 Summer Olympics
Medalists at the 2004 Summer Olympics
Medalists at the 2008 Summer Olympics
Officers of the Ordre national du Mérite
20th-century French people
21st-century French people